The 2017 European Combined Events Team Championships was the 33rd edition of the biennial international team track and field competition for European combined track and field events specialists, with contests in men's decathlon and women's heptathlon. It was the first edition to be held under that name, following a rebranding away from European Cup Combined Events. Held over 1–2 July, it consisted of three divisions: Super League, 1st League, and 2nd League. The Super League events were held at Kadriorg Stadium in Tallinn, Estonia, while the lower divisions were held at the Pista de Atletismo de Monzón in Monzón, Spain. National teams were ranked on the combined points totals of their best three athletes in both men's and women's competitions.

Ukraine won the Super League competition, led by Oleksiy Kasyanov and Alina Shukh. The Netherlands and Spain took first and second in the 1st League to gain promotion to the Super League. Lithuania and Latvia were the top two nations in the 2nd League, earning promotion to the 1st League. The best individual performers across the championships were Estonian Janek Õiglane in the decathlon, with a personal best of 8170 points, and Dutchwoman Nadine Broersen, with 6326 points in the heptathlon.

The reigning team champion Russia did not compete in the competition due to the nation's ban from international athletics for doping.

Divisions

Super League

Decathlon

Heptathlon

Team
Russia and Poland did not compete at the competition, thus were automatically relegated to the 1st League

First League

Decathlon

Heptathlon

Team

Second League

Decathlon

Heptathlon

Team

References

Results
 Results Super League 2017
 Results First League 2017
 Results Second League 2017

External links
Official website (archived)

European Combined Events Team Championships
European Cup Combined Events
European Cup Combined Events
European Cup Combined Events
International athletics competitions hosted by Estonia
European Cup Combined Events